Splendrillia panamensis is a species of sea snail, a marine gastropod mollusk in the family Drilliidae.

Description
The length of the shell between 7 mm and 15 mm.

Distribution
This marine species occurs in the Caribbean Sea off the San Blas Islands, Panama.

References

 Fallon P.J. (2016). Taxonomic review of tropical western Atlantic shallow water Drilliidae (Mollusca: Gastropoda: Conoidea) including descriptions of 100 new species. Zootaxa. 4090(1): 1–363

External links
 

panamensis
Gastropods described in 2016